Lamacoscylus usingeri is a species of beetle in the family Cerambycidae. It was described by Earle Gorton Linsley in 1935. It comes from Mexico.

References

Hemilophini
Beetles described in 1935
Taxa named by Earle Gorton Linsley